Lubbers Run is a creek running through Byram Township and Sparta in Sussex County in northwestern New Jersey. It is a tributary of the Musconetcong River, joining near Waterloo Village. The Lubbers Run Preserve is a  nature preserve in Byram Township.

See also
List of rivers of New Jersey

References

Rivers of New Jersey
Rivers of Sussex County, New Jersey
Musconetcong River
Tributaries of the Delaware River